Mungala Arjun (born 11 January 1986) is an Indian former cricketer. He played 23 first-class matches for Hyderabad between 2006 and 2013.

See also
 List of Hyderabad cricketers

References

External links
 

1986 births
Living people
Indian cricketers
Hyderabad cricketers
Cricketers from Hyderabad, India